Ranjan Abraham is an Indian film editor who predominantly works in Malayalam films. He has worked over 100 Malayalam films. He started as an assistant of noted editor G. Venkitaraman. His first independent assignment was Maravathoorkanavu directed by debutant Lal Jose. He frequently collaborated with Joshiy, Lal Jose and Vineeth Sreenivasan.

Career

He has debuted in Lal Jose directorial movie Oru Maravathoorkanavu in 1998. Since then he has been a regular editor of directors like Lal Jose, Vineeth Sreenivasan, Renjith, Johny Antony, Roshan Andrrews and Joshy.

Ranjan is from Kerala and now stays at Valsarvakom, Chennai with his wife and daughter. His works includes Meesa madhavan, Classmates, Udayananu Tharam, Thuruppugulan (2006 film), Rajamanikyam, C.I.D.Moosa, Raavanaprabhu and Thattathin Marayathu.

Filmography

Film Editor

Awards 
Kerala State Film Award for Best Editor for C.I.D. Moosa (2003)
Asianet Film Award for Best Editing for C.I.D. Moosa (2003)
Asianet Film Award for Best Editing for Various (2005)
Asianet Film Award for Best Editing for Classmates (2006)
Asianet Film Award for Best Editing for Veruthe Oru Bharya (2008)

References

External links 
 

Film editors from Kerala
Living people
Malayalam film editors
Kerala State Film Award winners
Year of birth missing (living people)